Ines Rudolph is an East German sprint canoer who competed in the late 1980s. She won a gold medal in the K-4 500 m event at the 1987 ICF Canoe Sprint World Championships in Duisburg.

References

East German female canoeists
Living people
Year of birth missing (living people)
ICF Canoe Sprint World Championships medalists in kayak